Blanket Creek Provincial Park is a provincial park in British Columbia, Canada. It hosts one of the nearest campgrounds for visitors going to the Mount Revelstoke National Park.

External links

Columbia Country
Provincial parks of British Columbia
1982 establishments in British Columbia